Granger Hall, a historic building currently located at 1700 E. 4th St. in National City, California, was built in 1898 as an "acoustically perfect" music auditorium addition to a smaller music room in the Paradise Valley estate of Ralph Granger.  Granger made a fortune in the "Last Chance" silver mine in Colorado during the 1890s.  The building, moved later, has also been known as Granger Music Hall.  It was listed on the National Register of Historic Places in 1975.

It was originally an  room.  It was designed by architect Irving Gill who learned acoustical technique working under Adler and Sullivan.  The acoustic properties include a design having no parallel walls or surfaces, including having the floor slope slightly forward and the ceiling and walls having "a slight canter".  The ceiling has a  mural of Euterpe, Greek goddess of music, and cherubs.

It was moved from its original location at 2600 East 8th 12 blocks to El Toyon Park, in 1969. It has a painted cedar shingle exterior.

References 

Irving Gill buildings
Buildings and structures completed in 1898
Buildings and structures in San Diego County, California
National Register of Historic Places in San Diego County, California
Auditoriums in the United States
Event venues on the National Register of Historic Places in California
1898 establishments in California